In the Mix is a 2005 American romantic crime-comedy-drama film starring R&B/pop singer Usher. It was released in the United States on November 23, 2005, the film being targeted at the traditionally large Thanksgiving weekend audience.

Plot 
While working in New York’s hottest night club, disc jockey Darrell Williams (Usher) is asked to DJ a party for his friend Frankie, Jr.'s (Anthony Fazio) mob boss father Frank, whom Darrell's father worked for. Frank is planning a surprise party for his daughter Dolly, who is coming home from law school for summer break. At the party, Darrell takes a bullet meant for Frank and saves his life. Frank takes Darrell to stay at Frank's house while healing from the gunshot wound. During this time, Dolly decides she wants to go out shopping. Due to the attempted assassination, Frank won't allow her to go out without a bodyguard. After he tries to assign her Jackie, he tells her anyone in the house is qualified to escort her, and she picks Darrell. He accepts a job with Frank to be Dolly's escort and live at the residence. The next morning, Dolly wakes Darrell to go out. They start at a yoga class, where Darrell gets women's attention. Dolly and Darrell go to lunch, where she meets her girlfriends and they have Darrell sit with them and give them advice about their men. After leaving the restaurant, Dolly is almost hit by a car and Darrell saves her. Jackie witnesses this and tells Frank. Frank invites Dolly's boyfriend to dinner. At dinner, Dolly excuses herself and goes to the garden. When Darrell comes home after being at the club, he finds Dolly in the pool. She invites Darrell to join her. In the pool, Dolly starts to flirt with Darrell. The next evening, Dolly and Chad go out with Darrell as their driver and end up at Darrell's favorite restaurant. When Cherise approaches Darrell, Chad - jealous about Dolly giving Darrell attention - asks her to join them. After dinner, Darrell ditches Cherise and Dolly sends Chad home. They go to Darrell's apartment/studio and are kissing before they are startled by Darrell's cat. Darrell tries to distance himself from Dolly, due to her having a boyfriend and out of respect for her father; but he is falling for Dolly, and takes her to meet Big Momma. Darrell and Dolly go to the club where Darrell works. While they are dancing, Jackie approaches them, pulling a gun on Darrell. Dolly and Darrell get out of the club and go to Darrell's friend's place, where they play poker with Darrell's friends. They return to Darrell's apartment/studio and spend the night together. The next day, during breakfast Dolly attempts to tell her father about her relationship with Darrell but his bodyguard Fish comes in. She tells Frank they will talk later. Dolly and Darrell leave the house and go to the spa together. While Dolly is in the shower, Frank shows up and his men rough up Darrell. When they take Darrell to their car to put him in the trunk, they find Salvatore dead. Dolly has a meeting with her father and agrees to end her relationship with Darrell. Dolly returns to Darrell's apartment/studio and tells him she is going to marry Chad. After she leaves, Darrell is kidnapped at gunpoint by one of Salvatore's men. Frank gets a call from Jackie that Dolly is with Darrell. Frank goes to the club and finds Dolly and Darrell together, kidnapped. Frank, Jr.,
follows his father to the club, and activates the strobe light and fog machine to distract the kidnappers. Jackie uses Dolly to make Frank put down his gun. Jackie attempts to shoot Dolly, and Darrell again gets shot, this time taking a bullet for Dolly. Frank finally accepts Darrell and Dolly being together. At the wedding reception for Darrell and Dolly, Frank gives Dolly his blessing on her marriage to Darrell.

Cast

Release
The film grossed $10,223,896 at the US box office.

Reception
In the Mix received negative reviews from critics. On Rotten Tomatoes it has an approval rating of 13% based on 38 reviews, with an average rating of 3.2/10. The site's critical consensus reads, "Fans may get a kick out of seeing Usher showcasing his charm on screen, but the movie itself is tone deaf and inconsequential, even by rom-com standards". On Metacritic, the film has a weighted score of 31 based on 15 critics, indicating "generally unfavorable reviews".

Home media
In the Mix was released on VHS and DVD on March 21, 2006 by Lionsgate.

Soundtrack
 Rico Love – "Settle Down"
 One Chance Jon A. Gordon, Michael A. Gordon (The Gordon Brothers)– "That's My Word"
 Christina Milian – "Be What It's Gonna Be"
 Chris Brown – "Which One" (featuring Noah!)
 Keri Hilson – "Hands & Feet"
 Rico Love – "Sweat" (featuring Usher)
 Ryon Lovett – "Get Acquainted"
 One Chance, Jon A. Gordon, Michael A. Gordon (The Gordon Brothers)– "Could This Be Love"
 Anthony Hamilton – "Some Kind of Wonderful"
 Robin Thicke – "Against the World"
 YoungBloodz – "Murda" (featuring Cutty and Fat Dog)
 Rico Love – "On the Grind" (featuring Juelz Santana and Paul Wall)

References

External links
 
 
 
 

2005 films
2005 romantic comedy-drama films
Mafia comedy films
Lionsgate films
20th Century Fox films
Films directed by Ron Underwood
Films scored by Aaron Zigman
American romantic comedy-drama films
Films about interracial romance
2000s English-language films
Romantic crime films
2000s American films